Crambodes is a monotypic moth genus of the family Noctuidae. Its only species, Crambodes talidiformis, is found in the eastern United States as far west as Kansas, Texas and Colorado. Both the genus and species were first described by Achille Guenée in 1852.

References

Condicinae
Monotypic moth genera